Jean-Louis d'Anglebermes (born 17 July 1953) is a New Caledonian politician. He is a pro-independence ethnic Kanak from Caledonian Union. 

Since 2014, he has served as a member of the collegial government. D'Anglebermes was elected Vice President of New Caledonia on 1 April 2015 in the cabinet of Philippe Germain. 

The first elections in which he participated were the provincial elections of 1995.

References

1953 births
Living people
Vice presidents of the Government of New Caledonia
Kanak people
Caledonian Union politicians
Black French politicians